Daqiao is a town in Pingwu County in a mountainous part of northern Sichuan province, China, located  west-southwest of the county seat. , it has one residential community and 13 villages under its administration.

References 

Towns in Sichuan
Pingwu County